The Drikung Gongchig ('The Single Intention' or 'One thought of Drikung') teaching is a commentary on the Buddha's teachings by Jigten Sumgon (1143–1217), the founder of the Drikung Kagyu lineage who is believed to be the reincarnation of Nagarjuna. He taught the Dharma to several thousand students for forty years.

Composition
The gongchig was composed in writing by his heart disciple Won Sherab Jungne (1187–1241). It is a late summary of the Buddha's teachings, in which Jigten Sumgon laid out the path of the Buddha's teachings as well as actual practice.

The gongchig is composed of 152 primary vajra statements with 46 supplemental vajra statements.
Won Sherab Jungne arranged these vajra statements into eight chapters of varying length:

Summary of the Key Points of the Wheel of Dharma (30 Statements)
Summary of the essential points of the emergence in dependence (15 statements)
Summary of the Essential Points of the Vinaya Pratimoksha (20 Statements)
Summary of the Essential Points of the Bodhisattva Training (24 Statements)
Summary of the knowledge holder of the secret mantra (28 statements)
The special view, meditation and behavior (20 statements)
The Resulting Ground of Buddhahood (15 Statements)
Additional statements (46 statements)

English translations

Commentaries
Chennga Dorje Sherab (12–13th centuries) wrote two extensive commentaries collectively known as the Dorshema (rdor she ma, a contraction of the name Dorje Sherab):

The Lamp of Illuminated Wisdom (snang mdzad ye shes sgron ma)
O Gema ('od ge ma).

References

Citations

Works cited

Further reading
Dkon mchog rgya mtsho. 2004. Chos rje 'jig rten mgon po'i slob ma. In 'Bri gung chos 'byung, pp. 311-343. Beijing: Mi rigs dpe skrun khang, pp. 338-339. TBRC W27020.
Kun dga' rin chen. 2003. Dbon rin po che shes rab 'byung gnas kyi rnam thar dad pa'i rgyan. In Gsung 'bum / kun dga' rin chen, vol. 1, pp. 165-177. Delhi: Drigung Kagyu Publications. TBRC W23892.

External links
Gongchig：Single Intent 貢奇：一意 1 of 32 on YouTube

Gongchig
Tibetan Buddhist philosophical concepts
Tibetan Buddhist practices